Jandakot Regional Park is a conservation park approximately  south of Perth, Western Australia, located within the Cities of Armadale, Canning, Cockburn, Gosnells and Kwinana as well as the Shire of Serpentine-Jarrahdale. It stretches from the southern end of Jandakot Airport to south of Casuarina Prison. 

In Western Australia, regional parks consist of areas of land that have been identified as having outstanding conservation, landscape and recreation values. Jandakot is one of eleven regional parks in the Perth region of Western Australia. The purpose of these regional parks is to serve as urban havens to preserve and restore cultural heritage and valuable ecosystems as well as to encourage sustainable nature-based recreation activities.

History
The concept of regional spaces in Western Australia open to the public was first proposed in 1955, when the Stephenson-Hepburn Report recommended preserving private land for future public use in what would become the Perth Metropolitan Region in 1963. The Environmental Protection Authority identified areas of significant conservation, landscape and recreation value, in a report in 1983. In 1989, the Western Australian State Government allocated the responsibility of managing regional parks with the Department of Conservation and Land Management.

The park has limited recreational use, with horse riders comprising the largest single user group, but is an important link in a series of reserves in the south-east metropolitan region of Perth.

Areas

Jandakot Regional Park consists of the following major areas:

References

External links
 Parks and Wildlife Service: Jandakot Regional Park

1997 establishments in Australia
Parks in Perth, Western Australia
Regional parks in Western Australia
Conservation parks of Western Australia